Kinder is a surname. Notable people with the surname include:

Chuck Kinder (1946–2019), American novelist
Claude W. Kinder (1852–1936), English railway engineer in China
Derek Kinder (born 1986), American football player
Donald Kinder (born 1947), American political scientist
Ellis Kinder (1914–1968), American baseball pitcher
Gary Kinder (born 1962), American decathlete
Gary Kinder (author), American writer on sociology and crime
Hermann Kinder (1944–2021), German writer
Jan Kinder (1944–2013), Norwegian ice hockey player
John Kinder (born 1974), American racing driver
John Kinder (priest) (1819–1903), New Zealand artist and photographer
Manfred Kinder (born 1938), West German sprinter
Mary Kinder (1909–1981), Prohibition-era gun moll
Peter Kinder (born 1954), American politician
Randy Kinder (born 1975), American football player
Richard Kinder (born 1944), American businessman, CEO of Kinder Morgan Energy Partners
Steve Kinder, American basketball coach
Vladimír Kinder (born 1969), Slovak footballer

Unisex given names